The Bells Go Down is a 1943 black-and-white wartime film made by Ealing Studios. The reference in the title is to the alarm bells in the fire station that "go down" when a call to respond is made. The film is an ensemble piece that covers the period between 27 August 1939 and 9 September 1940, when World War II began and London was subjected to aerial bombing, and is a tribute to the solidarity of not just those engaged in service, but among the British people as a whole.

It was produced by Michael Balcon and directed by Basil Dearden and was intended to give praise to the British Auxiliary Fire Service (AFS). Although the plot employs fictitious landmarks and localities, many of the incidental shots were taken at actual fires caused by the air raids on London in the previous two years. A sub-plot depicted the rivalry between the part-time AFS and the full-time London Fire Brigade (the two brigades merged into the National Fire Service in 1941). The reasons for joining the service, the training and finally the work and tragedy during September 1940 Blitz on London were shown for several characters. The background narration was spoken by Leo Genn.

The film was released at nearly the same time as the similar Fires Were Started, a fictional "documentary" that used actual firemen instead of professional actors, and as a result was sometimes reviewed unfavorably by comparison.

The score was originally offered to William Walton, but for various reasons (possibly including that he had lost his own home in the Blitz) he offered it to his musical assistant Roy Douglas.

Plot 
On 3 September 1939, at the start of World War II, several East End Londoners join the London County Council Auxiliary Fire Service. Tommy Turk (Trinder) is a light-hearted gambler who avoids work, living with his mother (Varley) who runs a local fish and chip shop. Tommy has bought a greyhound pup he names "Short Head" and hopes to race. Bob Matthews (Friend) is a newcomer to the East End who just lost his job and has to postpone his wedding to Nan Harper (Hiatt) as a result. Tommy and Bob meet in The Hopvine, a pub run by Ma and Pa Robbins (Muriel George and Pierce), whose son Ted (Mason) is a fireman with the London Fire Brigade. Ted's girl Susie has just joined the brigade as a dispatcher, but Ma Robbins cannot hide her thinly disguised disapproval of Susie's love of dance halls. The Army won't accept new enlistments, so Tommy persuades Bob to join the AFS with him. Sam, a small-time thief of barrels of Guinness, inadvertently joins the service while trying to avoid the clutches of Eastchapel Police Constable O'Brien (Richard George), who dogs him with the persistence of Javert. The three are assigned immediately to the "Q" sub-station of the East End's District 21, set up in a school to train under Ted.

"Q sub" responds to its first call at Christmas. Although the fire is out when they arrive, crusty District Officer MacFarlane (Currie) is impressed with Ted's efforts and posts him, along with Tommy, Sam and Bob, as a crew at District 21's superintendent's station. Nan and Bob finally marry and take a flat near Benjamin's Wharf. She becomes pregnant, suffering fainting spells, and befriends Ma Turk. Ted is reluctant to marry, so Susie goes dancing with ladies' man Tommy as a means of making Ted jealous, while Ted rides Tommy for his apparent aversion to fighting fires. Tommy races Short Head, who perpetually loses, costing not just Tommy, but his fellow firemen who have wagered on her. Sam continues to steal barrels of Guinness, but O'Brien begins to close in.

In August 1940 the Battle of Britain is raging, but London has not yet been bombed. The 21-Q crew have yet to fight a serious fire and have become sensitive about it. Tommy discovers Short Head has been losing because Ma Turk has been feeding her doughnuts, and he enters her in a high-stakes race on 7 September, planning to wager all his money. His plans are interrupted that afternoon by the first massive German air raid on London, which targets the East End Docks. The widespread fires cause chaos as water lines are broken and AFS crews are pressed into front-line service. Ted saves Tommy's life by using a high-pressure hose to knock him away from a delay-action bomb just before it explodes. The second night of the blitz, the 21-Q crew, still struggling to bring the docks fire under control, have forged bonds with their full-time counterparts and officers in action. Ted's parents are unaccounted for, and Susie goes to find them. The Hopvine has been bombed, but through Susie's persistence, they are found in the cellar and rescued. The next morning, during a break, Tommy learns that Short Head won her race—but he forgot to place the wager.

The third night German bombers return again, creating a huge fire at Benjamin's Wharf, and the District 21 crews are shifted there. Bob finds himself fighting a warehouse fire from inside his own burning flat, which has been declared expendable. However he takes comfort in the knowledge that Nan, about to give birth, is safe with Ma Turk at St John's Hospital. P.C. O'Brien arrives to arrest Sam, but a bomb explosion blows him into the River Thames, where Sam rescues him from drowning. Soon they learn that St John's Hospital is also on fire. Chief MacFarlane transfers Ted's crew to the hospital fire and enters the burning building to direct efforts to save the main building. Bob learns that Nan is safe and he has a new son. Another bomb strikes the hospital, trapping Chief MacFarlane. Tommy beats Ted to the ladder and finds the chief, but the building collapses, killing both. Some time after the fire is out, all the survivors and their families gather in the bombed local church to christen the baby, who Nan and Bob have decided to name "Tommy".

Cast 
 Tommy Trinder as Tommy Turk
 James Mason as Ted Robbins
 Philip Friend as Bob Matthews
 Mervyn Johns as Sam
 William Hartnell as Brooks
 Finlay Currie as District Officer MacFarlane
 Philippa Hiatt as Nan Matthews
 Meriel Forbes as Susie
 Beatrice Varley as Ma Turk
 Norman Pierce as Pa Robbins
 Muriel George as Ma Robbins
 Richard George as PC O'Brien

References

External links

 
screenonline
timeout film review

1943 films
Battle of Britain films
British black-and-white films
British drama films
Films directed by Basil Dearden
Films produced by Michael Balcon
Films about firefighting
World War II films made in wartime
Films set in London
1943 drama films
1940s English-language films
1940s British films